C. gouldii may refer to:
 Cardamine gouldii, a plant species in the genus Cardamine found in Bhutan
 Chalinolobus gouldii, the Gould's wattled bat, a bat species found in Australia
 Cylichna gouldii, a sea snail species

See also
 Gouldii (disambiguation)